Stephen L. Nass (born October 7, 1952) is an American politician from Wisconsin. A  Republican, he has been a member of the Wisconsin State Senate since 2015, and was a member of the Wisconsin State Assembly from 1991 to 2015.

Early life and education
Nass was born in Whitewater, Wisconsin on October 7, 1952. He graduated from Whitewater High School in 1978 and receiving a B.S. from the University of Wisconsin–Whitewater in 1978. He received a M.S. Ed. in school business management from UW-Whitewater in 1990.

Military and business career
Nass was a member of the Wisconsin Air National Guard and deployed in Operation Desert Shield and Operation Desert Storm. According to his legislative biography, he retired as a chief master sergeant, owns a rental property business, and formerly was a payroll benefits analyst.

Political career
Nass was a member of the Whitewater City Council from 1977 to 1981 and a member of the UW-Whitewater Board of Visitors from 1979 to 1989. He was first elected to the Wisconsin State Assembly in 1990, from the 31st Assembly District, and was thereafter reelected. He remained a member of the Assembly until 2014, when he was elected to the Wisconsin State Senate from the 11th District. Nass is one of the Senate's most conservative members.

Nass has become known for his adversarial relationship with the University of Wisconsin System, which he accuses of "liberal indoctrination." That position that assumed greater significance in 2007–08, when Nass was chair of the Assembly's Colleges and Universities Committee, which oversees the entire UW System, and 2010, when Nass regained control of the committee (after Republicans regained a majority of the state Senate). In 2007, Nass worked to cut funds for specific University of Wisconsin programs that he disagreed with philosophically, including the Havens Wright Center for Social Justice in UW–Madison's sociology department and the UW-Extension School For Workers, saying that they are "too far to the left." Paul Soglin, the mayor of Madison, Wisconsin, responded by calling Nass "the outlaw chairman of an Assembly committee that is designed to destroy the University of Wisconsin System." In 2017, Nass accused UW of waging a "war on men" with an initiative about masculinity, and criticized a course offered by UW on white privilege. By 2020, Nass was the vice chair of the universities committee.

In 2010, Nass said he would introduce legislation banning pavement markers designed to minimize conflicts between bicyclists and motorists. Nass accused "liberal extremists in Madison who hate cars and think everyone should bike to work" with "basically making it difficult to use an automobile." Nass's position drew a caustic response from Madison mayor Dave Cieslewicz, who noted that Madison is 70 miles from the district that Nass represents. "Not having been able to solve a single significant state problem (which they actually got elected to do) in their combined 37 years in office these guys now want to micromanage the city of Madison. There's a way they can do that, of course. They can give up their seats in the Legislature and run for the Madison City Council."

Nass is a supporter of Donald Trump. In 2017, Wisconsin taxpayers paid $966 to send Nass to Trump's first speech to a joint session of Congress, and in 2019, during the Trump's first impeachment, he accused Trump's enemies of "vile efforts to effectuate a political coup of the president." Nass has sponsored legislation to declare English the official language of Wisconsin.

During the COVID-19 pandemic, Nass criticized public health measures put into place by Democratic Governor Tony Evers, and in April 2020, Nass accused the state Health Secretary, Andrea Palm, of promoting "excessive levels of fear." In July 2020, after Evers issued an order requiring the wearing of face coverings in public indoor spaces to prevent the spread of the virus, Nass called the order "illegal and unnecessary" and urged the state legislature to convene an emergency session to repeal the order. During the pandemic, Nass supported the termination of Evers' emergency declarations. He also pushed to require state workers to return to physical offices, revoke funding for schools that did not hold in-person classes, restrict the power of state and local health agencies, and expand school choice programs. He introduced legislation to block the University of Wisconsin from instituting COVID-19 testing, masking and vaccination protocols on its campuses across the state.

References

1952 births
21st-century American politicians
Living people
Republican Party members of the Wisconsin State Assembly
People from La Grange, Wisconsin
People from Whitewater, Wisconsin
University of Wisconsin–Whitewater alumni
Wisconsin city council members
Republican Party Wisconsin state senators